Cornacchia, the Italian word for crow, is a surname.

People with the name
Giorgio Cornacchia (born c. 1925), Italian rugby league footballer
Giovanni Cornacchia (born 1939), Italian hurdler
Michael Cornacchia (born 1975), American actor
Rick Cornacchia (born 1951), Italian-born Canadian ice hockey coach

Italian-language surnames